The Tunsberg Tunnel is a road tunnel in Voss Municipality in Vestland county, Norway. That stretch of roadway was full of narrow, tight hairpin turns. The tunnel has no turns and has a maximum grade of 5.07%. It was officially opened on 20 December 2011 by Magnhild Meltveit Kleppa, the Minister of Transport and Communications at that time.

References

Voss
Road tunnels in Vestland
Tunnels completed in 2011
2011 establishments in Norway